Hassar wilderi is a species of thorny catfish endemic to Brazil where it is only found in the Tocantins River basin.   This species grows to a length of  TL.

References 
 

Doradidae
Fish of South America
Fish of Brazil
Endemic fauna of Brazil
Fish described in 1895